Krenzler Field is a soccer stadium in Cleveland, Ohio on the campus of Cleveland State University (CSU). It serves as the home field to the CSU men's and women's varsity soccer teams, the CSU varsity men's lacrosse team, and formerly the Cleveland City Stars of the USL First Division. Krenzler Field became the home of Cleveland's Minor League Soccer team AFC Cleveland of the National Premier Soccer League in 2013. It is named in honor of Judge Alvin Krenzler.

The 1,680-seat stadium was built in 1985 and has received many upgrades since, including the addition of an air supported dome in winter months to provide an indoor practice facility. The field surface is FieldTurf.

References

External links
 Information at CSU athletics
 Facilities - Official Athletic Site of Cleveland State University
Krenzler Field - Official Athletic Site of Cleveland State University
 AFC Cleveland Royals - Stadium

Sports venues in Cleveland
Cleveland State Vikings
Soccer venues in Ohio
College lacrosse venues in the United States
College soccer venues in the United States
Cleveland City Stars
Cleveland SC
Sports venues completed in 1985
Air-supported structures
National Premier Soccer League stadiums
1985 establishments in Ohio